Psara guatalis is a moth in the family Crambidae. It was described by William Schaus in 1920. It is found in Guatemala.

The wingspan is about 27 mm. The forewings are silky brown, faintly tinged with purple. There is an almost imperceptible dark postmedial line. The hindwings are silky brown and more thinly scaled.

References

Spilomelinae
Moths described in 1920